Autosticha leukosa is a moth in the family Autostichidae. It was described by Kyu-Tek Park and Chun-Sheng Wu in 2003. It is found in Sichuan, China.

The wingspan is 14–16 mm. The forewings are creamy white with scattered brownish scales and two spots at the subbasal area. There is a brownish spot on the costa at the middle and a large suffusion at the apical three-fourths. The first discal stigma is large, with the small plical below it and the second at the end of the cell. There is a series of brownish spots along the termen and three to four dots at their inner side. There is also a large triangular brownish suffusion on the tornus. The hindwings are greyish brown.

Etymology
The species name refers to the creamy white wing colour and is derived from leukos (meaning white).

References

Moths described in 2003
Autosticha
Moths of Asia